Van Leeuwen Ice Cream is an American ice cream parlor chain.

History 

Van Leeuwen began as a food truck in New York City in 2008 between Pete Van Leeuwen, his brother Ben, and their partner Laura O'Neill. Their yellow trucks sold flavors based on imported ingredients like Ceylon cinnamon, Sicilian pistachios, and vanilla from Papua New Guinea. The American private equity firm Nextworld invested $18.7 million in the company in 2020. By 2021, Van Leeuwen had opened 27 stores across the United States, including 17 in New York City. Van Leeuwen opened its 30th store in 2022 with their first locations in Dallas and Colorado.

In November 2022, Van Leeuwen entered a settlement agreement with the New York City Department of Consumer and Worker Protection. The chain agreed to comply with a New York City law that banned retail stores from refusing to accept cash as payment and to pay $33,000 in outstanding civil penalties. Van Leeuwen had been violating the law since it went into effect in November 2020 and had declined to show up for any administrative hearings.

References

External links 

 

2008 establishments in New York City
Ice cream brands
American companies established in 2008